Miles from the Lightning is the debut album of singer/songwriter Jeffrey Foucault, released in 2001. It is a low-key album mainly consisting of ballads. He is joined by Peter Mulvey.

Reception

Writing for No Depression, music critic Linda Ray called Foucault "the bard of small-town anywhere" and wrote of the album "Foucault delivers his plaintive poetry in the troubadour tradition... His insights are of the small, cold places in Wisconsin he calls home."

Track listing 
All songs by Jeffrey Foucault.
"Ballad of Copper Junction (A Journeyman's Lament)" – 5:08
"Dove and the Waterline" – 3:50
"Walking at Dusk (The Liberty Bell)" – 4:39
"Thistledown Tears" – 5:13
"Californ-I-A" – 4:29
"Highway and the Moon" –  6:37
"Battle Hymn (of the College Dropout Farmhand)" – 4:39
"Crossing Mississippi" – 4:20
"Secretariat" – 6:32
"Sunrise in the Rearview" – 5:04
"Street Light Halos" – 2:48
"Buckshot Moon" – 5:35
"I'm Alright" – 5:03
"Miles From the Lightning" – 3:20

Personnel
 Jeffrey Foucault - acoustic guitar, vocals  
Peter Mulvey - guitar, lap steel guitar, background vocals
Production notes:
 Produced by Jeffrey Foucault
 Design by Eric Stein
 Photography by Eric Vandeveld and Mark Olson

References

External links
 Official Jeffrey Foucault website
Signature Sounds Recordings

2001 debut albums
Jeffrey Foucault albums